Domaszków may refer to the following places in Poland:
Domaszków in Gmina Międzylesie, Kłodzko County in Lower Silesian Voivodeship (SW Poland)
Domaszków in Gmina Wołów, Wołów County in Lower Silesian Voivodeship (SW Poland)